Glen Park Municipal Swimming Pool is a historic swimming pool in River Falls, Wisconsin. The complex includes a pool and two American Craftsman Style buildings. The pool was built as a Civil Works Administration project during the Great Depression. Work on the pool began in 1933-34 and continued through 1937 with additional support from the Public Works Administration and Works Progress Administration. Engineer Herman T. Hagestad, who would later become city engineer and ultimately mayor of River Falls, designed the pool. The pool was added to the National Register of Historic Places in 2007 and is still operational.

References

External links
City of River Falls Parks And Recreation: Parks

Buildings and structures completed in 1937
Buildings and structures in Pierce County, Wisconsin
Tourist attractions in Pierce County, Wisconsin
River Falls, Wisconsin
National Register of Historic Places in Pierce County, Wisconsin
Park buildings and structures on the National Register of Historic Places in Wisconsin